IFK Västerås is a Swedish football club located in Västerås.

Background
Idrottsföreningen Kamraterna Västerås were formed in 1898 and at their best played in series games in Sweden for several seasons in Sweden's next highest division; the first season in 1924/1925, and last time in 1987. The club has also had successes in athletics. The club is active in soccer, skiing, figure skating, and bowling. The club has formerly been active in ice hockey, but this section is, as of 2009, inactive.

Since their foundation IFK Västerås has participated mainly in the upper and middle divisions of the Swedish football league system.  The club currently plays in Division 4 Västmanland which is the sixth tier of Swedish football. They play their home matches at the Swedbank Park in Västerås.

IFK Västerås are affiliated to the Västmanlands Fotbollförbund.

Season to season

In their early history IFK Västerås competed in the following divisions:

In recent seasons IFK Västerås have competed in the following divisions:

Attendances

In recent seasons IFK Västerås have had the following average attendances:

Footnotes

External links
 IFK Västerås – Official website

Sport in Västerås
Football clubs in Västmanland County
Association football clubs established in 1898
1898 establishments in Sweden
Idrottsföreningen Kamraterna